David Labarre (born 24 May 1988) is a French politician, entrepreneur and former football 5-a-side player who played as a midfielder. He is a Paralympic silver medalist and is the founder of the Cécifoot team in Toulouse.

Sporting career
Labarre was inspired to play football when he watched the 1998 World Cup and he idolised Zinedine Zidane since he was ten years old. He began playing the sport when he was fourteen years old and dreamt of becoming a professional footballer, he joined an able-bodied football club and he enjoyed the training very much. Once he found his passion for sport, he experienced a major tragedy when his mother died suddenly. Labarre competed internationally for France when he was seventeen years old and has won four national championships, three IBSA World Cups and a silver medal at the 2012 Summer Paralympics.

Labarre is also known as a "mountain adventurer" as he regularly goes mountain hiking in the Pyrenees, he grew up in Aspet in the Comminges In 2018, he attempted to go up four of the world's tallest mountain summits, he climbed up Aneto, Mount Toubkal, Mont Blanc and Himalayas with a sighted guide.

Political career
As well as football, Labarre was also interested in the French presidential elections, particularly following Jean Lassalle for two days during the 2003 presidential elections who he knew very well as Lassalle lived in a village not far from Labarre. 

Labarre decided to run as a member of Parliament in 2017 and is a candidate for Lassalle's political party Résistons!. He proposed to increase employment and improving teleworking services in the Comminges under his constituency.

References

External links
 
 

1988 births
Living people
People from Saint-Gaudens, Haute-Garonne
Paralympic 5-a-side footballers of France
French footballers
French politicians with disabilities
5-a-side footballers at the 2012 Summer Paralympics
Medalists at the 2012 Summer Paralympics
Paralympic silver medalists for France
French blind people